The NS 1600 was a series of steam engines of the Dutch national railways, Nederlandse Spoorwegen (NS), and its predecessors Maatschappij tot Exploitatie van Staatsspoorwegen (SS), Hollandsche IJzeren Spoorweg-Maatschappij (HSM) and Nederlandsche Rhijnspoorweg-Maatschappij (NRS).

Two locomotives of this series were involved in the train disaster at Twello (The Netherlands) in 1900.

NRS 101-109 (HSM 350-358, NS 1601-1609)
The Nederlandsche Rhijnspoorweg-Maatschappij (NRS) ordered nine locomotives numbered 101–109 at Sharp Stewart and Company located in Glasgow in 1899. The axle configuration of these locomotives was 2'B. These were the first locomotives in The Netherlands with a bogie in front of the driving wheels. Originally these locomotives were equipped with a speedometer of the system Kapteyn, which was driven by one of the axles of the bogie. A sanding system of Gresham & Craven was fitted as well.

A year after the order of these locomotives, the NRS was disbanded and these were its last locomotives ordered. The equipment of the disbanded railroad was split over  Hollandsche IJzeren Spoorweg-Maatschappij (HSM) and Maatschappij tot Exploitatie van Staatsspoorwegen (SS); each railroad receiving the same number of locomotives randomly being assigned. Locomotives 101, 102, 103, 108 and 109 transferred to the SS and were renumbered in SS numbers 1101-1103 and 1108–1109. Locomotives 104-107 transferred to HSM and were renumbered HSM 350–353. As the locomotives were too long for the small SS turntables, the SS transferred them in 1891 to the HSM, where they were renumbered 354–358. They were nicknamed "Rhijnbogen" at the HSM in honour of their NRS heritage and their bogies.

At the merger of the equipment of HSM and SS in 1921, the locomotives were numbered in the  NS 1601–1609. The locomotives were taken out of service between 1935 and 1938, with the exception of 1604. This locomotive continued in service until 1940. Locomotive 1604 was chosen for inclusion in the collection of the Dutch Railway Museum (Nederlands Spoorwegmuseum). To this purpose it was stored in the locomotive facility in Maastricht. On 8 September 1944 the locomotive was severely damaged due to war activities. After the complete liberation of The Netherlands, the NS main service center in Tilburg fully restored the locomotive. The locomotive was restored to the brown outfit of the NRS, with its original number 107. The locomotive has been on display in the Spoorwegmuseum since March 1955. After the completion of modernization of the Spoorwegmuseum, completed in 2005, the locomotive can be viewed from the bottom as well.

HSM 359-408 (NS 1610-1659)
The HSM was impressed by the service of the locomotive, and ordered an additional 40 locomotives at Sharp Steward and Company. These additional locomotives had a wider smokebox, a chimney with a crown and rising support plates next to the smokebox. The additional units entered service between 1891 and 1892, with numbers 359–398.  In 1900 another 5 locomotives were ordered at Sharp Stewart and Company and delivered with numbers 399–403.

In 1903 another 5 units were added to the order. These locomotives were built by the North British Locomotive Company, into which Sharp Stewart and Company was included. They were numbered 404–408. In 1921 the locomotives were renumbered in NS 1610–1659. These last units had a higher steam pressure and a larger tractive force of 5030 kg. The steam dome was located further to the rear on the boiler.

Later in their career nine locomotives (350-358) received tenders from HSM 600 series locomotives (601-605 and 609–612) when these units entered service in 1895 and 1896. These new tenders had larger water and coal capacity and were more suitable for fast-train service. Numbers 1614, 1633, 1636, 1636 and 1646 did get a superheater installed in 1921. Due to poor results, the planned application to the other units was cancelled. The locomotives were withdrawn from service starting from 1936 to 1949. Unit 1614, withdrawn from service in 1938, was used a stationary boiler in Zwolle. In 1940, the locomotive re-entered service, with its superheater elements being shorted. Locomotive 1622 was the last of the series to be withdrawn from service in 1949. Units 1614, 1621 and 1640 got a Weir feeder pump installed.

Rental
In 1899 the Nederlandsche Centraal-Spoorweg-Maatschappij (NCS) rented locomotive 105 from the NRS for a few months. As the turntable in Zwolle was too short for the locomotive, the locomotive and tender were disconnected, turned separately and reconnected. The NCS rented 390, 395 and 405 of the HSM for a few months in 1917.

Overview

References
 R.C. Statius Muller, A.J. Veenendaal jr., H. Waldorp: De Nederlandse stoomlocomotieven. Uitg. De Alk, Alkmaar, 2005. .
 J. van der Meer: De Hollandsche IJzeren Spoorweg-Maatschappij. Uitg. Uquilair, 2009, .
 J.J. Karskens: De Locomotieven van de Hollandsche IJzeren Spoorweg Maatschappij. Uitg. J.H. Gottmer, Haarlem - Antwerpen, 1947.
 M.A. Asselberghs: Nederlands Spoorwegmuseum. Een wandeling langs de verzameling. Uitg. Nederlands Spoorwegmuseum, Utrecht, 1987.

Railway companies of the Netherlands
Steam locomotives of the Netherlands
Maatschappij tot Exploitatie van Staatsspoorwegen
Hollandsche IJzeren Spoorweg-Maatschappij
4-4-0 locomotives
Nederlandsche Rhijnspoorweg-Maatschappij